Glenville Te Punga o Te Arawa Barclay (6 September 1888 – 19 February 1959) (surname Pakere in Māori) was a New Zealand professional rugby league footballer who played in the 1900s and 1910s. He played at representative level for New Zealand Māori, and at club level for North Sydney, as a forward (prior to the specialist positions of), during the era of contested scrums.

International honours
Barclay represented New Zealand Māori on the groundbreaking 1908 New Zealand Māori rugby league tour of Australia.

Genealogical information
Barclay was the brother of the rugby league footballer, Frank Barclay (whose Māori name was Hauāuru Pakere).

References

1888 births
1959 deaths
New Zealand Māori rugby league players
New Zealand Māori rugby league team players
New Zealand rugby league players
North Sydney Bears players
Place of death missing
Rugby league players from Tauranga
Rugby league forwards